Zack Hemsey (born May 30, 1983) is an American composer, songwriter, and filmmaker best known for the use of his music in movies and trailers.

Personal life
Hemsey grew up in New Jersey with his older sister Tara. He graduated from Palisades Park High School in 2001, and studied music and philosophy at Rutgers University, graduating with a summa cum laude.

Career 
Hemsey began his career as the composer for an obscure hip-hop group called Nine Leaves, where he was one of five lyricists. He began his solo career in 2010 with the release of his first album "Empty Room" and has continued to independently release his own music, which tends to combine elements of alternative hip-hop, alternative rock, classical orchestra, and/or world instrumentation.

His work "Mind Heist" was used in the film trailer for Inception as well as for the video game Madden NFL 12, and is occasionally used by the television series America's Got Talent. Hemsey's music has been featured in film trailers for The Town, Lincoln, 2 Guns, and others. His song "Vengeance" was prominently featured in the film The Equalizer, as well as in trailers for the second season of the HBO program Game of Thrones and the 21st Century Fox miniseries 24: Live Another Day; the latter aired during Fox Sports' U.S. TV broadcast of Super Bowl XLVIII.

In 2020, Hemsey made his directorial debut, in which he shot, produced, and edited a feature length documentary titled BIRTH.  The film explores the psychology of labor and the birth experience, through the lens of an unmedicated homebirth.  The film was released online worldwide on the iTunes Store and Vimeo OnDemand.

Hemsey has written articles on a variety of subject matter, which he has published on his blog "Thoughts & Ramblings." Topics have included the difference between artists and entertainers, mixed martial arts, the birth of his children, the music industry, and a research paper on a rare GBS infection that can occur in newborn babies.

Discography
Albums
"Empty Room" (March 2010)
"The Way" (June 2011)
"RONIN" (April 2013)
"NOMAD" (November 2016)
"GOLIATH (Original Motion Picture Soundtrack to a Film That Doesn't Exist)" (March 2018)

EPs
"Mind Heist" (May 2011)
"The Candidate (Original Motion Picture Soundtrack)" (October 2011)
"That Which You Seek" (January 2012)

Singles
"Empty Room (Trailer Version)" (June 2010)
"R.E.F. (Warrior's Lullabye)" (September 2010)
"Lifespan (Resurrection)" (March 2011)
"Revelations (Remix)" (March 2011)
"Changeling (New Beginnings)" (March 2011)
"The Home of a People" (June 2012)
"Finding Home" (June 2012)

Bonus Content
"Empty Room (The Instrumentals)" (March 2010)
"The Way (Bonus Disk)" (June 2011)
"RONIN (Instrumentals)" (April 2014)
"NOMAD (Instrumentals)" (January 2017)

Music Videos
"Yesterday" (October 2008)
"Waiting Between Worlds" (April 2012)

Albums (under Nine Leaves)
"Nine Leaves" (January 2006)
"Peace In Death" (August 2008)
"Volume One (1999-2001)" (August 2022)
"Volume Two (2002-2003)" (August 2022)
"Volume Three (2004-2005)" (August 2022)
"Volume Four (2006-2008)" (August 2022)

Music credits in Trailer / Film

See also 
 Alternative hip hop
 Alternative rock
 Film score
 Trailer music
 Trip hop
 Hans Zimmer

References

External links
 
 Official blog

 

1983 births
Living people
American film score composers
American male film score composers